Ivan Mishukov (born 6 May 1992 in Reutov) is a Russian citizen, notable for being a feral child who lived with dogs for about two years between the ages of 4 and 6.

Early life and adoption by dog pack
Ivan Mishukov was born in Reutov on 6 May 1992. When he was four, he left his home to escape his mother and her alcoholic boyfriend. Ivan gained the dogs' trust by providing them with food, and in return, he was protected by the pack. Eventually, he was made pack-leader.

Capture
Mishukov was captured by Moscow police in 1998, when he was six. The police separated the boy from the dogs by leaving bait for the pack in a restaurant kitchen. Prior to capture, he had escaped the police three times, defended by the pack. Because he had lived among the dogs for only two years, he was able to re-learn the Russian language. He now speaks very fluently and intelligently, and has given interviews on Russian and Ukrainian national television. He studied in military school and served in the Russian Army.

Influence
In 2009, his story influenced English playwright Hattie Naylor to write a play about his time on the streets called Ivan and the Dogs. which won the Tinniswood Award for original radio drama and was nominated in the 2010 Olivier Awards for Outstanding Contribution to Theatre. The play was adapted for the cinema as Lek and the Dogs (2017).

The story of Ivan Mishukov caught the attention of Australian writer Eva Hornung, whose novel Dog Boy (2009) shares many of the same elements of Ivan's story, including capture by leaving bait at a restaurant. Another author, Bobbie Pyron, also wrote a book about Ivan and his time on the streets with the dogs, called The Dogs of Winter.

References

1992 births
Feral children
Canids and humans
Living people
Russian military personnel